Ultimate Survival Alaska was an American television reality competition series produced by Brian Catalina Productions that premiered on the National Geographic Channel on May 12, 2013. The series was executive produced by Brian Catalina, Kristina Wood, John Magennis, Claire Kosloff, Victoria Levy, and Peter Goest. 

Ultimate Survival Alaska focused on survivalist men and women who were dropped off in the Alaskan wilderness where they compete with each other in various wilderness races. The survivalists were dropped off by aircraft in the Alaskan wilderness where they compete in races through Alaska's unpredictable weather, barren landscapes, and hostile predators. The series was cancelled after season 3.

Series overview

Season 1 (2013)
In the first season, 10 episodes document the survivalists' experiences at specific location points during the  race. The main goal in each episode is to survive using minimal gear, and to reach a certain destination point within 72 hours.

Cast
 Austin Manelick 
 Brent Sass 
 Dallas Seavey 
 Marty Raney 
 Matt Raney 
 Tyrell Seavey 
 Tyler Johnson 
 Willi Prittie

Season 2 (2013/14)
The second season had 13 episodes and focused on four teams of survivalists with different areas of expertise: woodsmen, mountaineers, military veterans, and endurance athletes. Each team had the task of reaching an extraction point faster than the other teams. There were multiple drop off and extraction points with different terrain for each leg of the contest. In Season 2, the time limit to reach the end of each leg was reduced down to 60 hours.

Teams
The contestants were divided into four teams of three.

Results

 The Woodsmen Team was eliminated after missing Extraction due to Jimmy's injury.
 Rudy left the competition after Episode 7 due to an injury.
 Leg 11 was double-length, shown over two episodes. The placements listed in the first column reflect the order teams arrived at the leg's halfway point.

Season 3 (2015)

Teams
For season 3 the series remains with the format of four teams of three. Italicized contestants are returning contestants from previous seasons.

 Lower 48 & Military finished tied with 3 points each. However Lower 48 took 2nd place based on 2nd-place finishes: 4-3.

Results

 Leg 13 was worth 2 points.
 James Sweeney withdrew from the competition after Leg 7 due to pain in his back and worry that he had damaged his artificial hip.

Episode list

Season One

Season Two

Season Three

Critical reception
David Hinckley of the Daily News gave the second season a satisfactory review, saying "things do look consistently harsh and cold, which should satisfy most people who would watch a show about Alaska. The only thing that really looks warm is that big old bear in the brown coat, and he doesn’t look like he’s interested in sharing any of the insulation."

References

External links

 

2010s American reality television series
2013 American television series debuts
2015 American television series endings
English-language television shows
National Geographic (American TV channel) original programming
Television shows set in Alaska
Works about survival skills